Edward Ambrose Kelleher (June 29, 1894 – July 19, 1945) was an American college basketball head coach. He served as the head coach at St. John's University, Fordham University, and the United States Military Academy and amassed an overall career record of 257 wins and 105 losses.

During his tenure at Fordham, Kelleher installed a fast-pace offense that prioritized high-scoring games modeled after the west coast style of play (the east coast played a slower, more defensive-oriented brand of basketball). He coached the famous "Wonder Fives", the teams between 1924 and 1929 who lost only nine total games.  During a three-year stretch between 1926–27 and 1928–29, his Rams went 48–4. They were named "Eastern champions" all three years. Kelleher's other highlights as the Rams coach include coaching their first two All-Americans, Frank Dougherty and Bob Mullens, as well as guiding the school to its first-ever postseason tournament. In 1942–43, his last season at Fordham, he led the Rams to a fourth-place finish in the 1943 National Invitation Tournament.

When Fordham temporarily dropped their basketball program due to World War II, Kelleher signed a short-term contract with the Military Academy to be their head coach. The plan was to return to Fordham once they re-commissioned a basketball team. In his first season at Army, his team finished the season with a 15–0 record and was retroactively named the national champion by the Helms Athletic Foundation and the Premo-Porretta Power Poll. Then, in 1944–45, his Army squad went 14–1, giving his two-year head coaching tenure at Army an overall record of 29–1. He coached Dale Hall, a consensus All-American who later became the head men's basketball coach at New Hampshire and the head football coach at Army. He also coached Edward C. Christl, for whom Army's home basketball arena is named, as well as future four-star general John Hennessey. 

After the 1944–45 season ended, Kelleher went to Europe as a civilian with the United States Armed Forces. He died on July 19, 1945 in Munich, Germany of a heart attack. He is buried at Lorraine American Cemetery in Saint-Avold, France.

Kelleher is memorialized by the Edward A. Kelleher Trophy, which is awarded each year to the winner of the National Invitation Tournament.

Head coaching record

References

1894 births
1945 deaths
Army Black Knights men's basketball coaches
Basketball coaches from New York (state)
College men's basketball head coaches in the United States
Fordham Rams men's basketball coaches
Niagara University alumni
Sportspeople from New York City
St. John's Red Storm men's basketball coaches
United States Army personnel killed in World War II
United States Army civilians
Burials at Lorraine American Cemetery and Memorial
American civilians killed in World War II